Danaeifard is an Iranian surname. Notable people with the surname include:

Ali Danaeifard (1921–1979), Iranian footballer and manager
Iraj Danaeifard (1951–2018), Iranian footballer, son of Ali

Persian-language surnames